Cumia is a genus of sea snails, marine gastropod mollusks in the family Colubrariidae.

Species
Species within the genus Cumia include:
 Cumia adjuncta (Iredale, 1929)
 Cumia alfredensis (Bartsch, 1915)
 Cumia antillana (Sarasúa, 1978)
 Cumia bednalli (Brazier, 1875)
 Cumia brazieri (Angas, 1869)
 Cumia clavula Watters, 2009
 Cumia janlochi (Parth, 1991)
 Cumia lucasi (Bozzetti, 2007)
 Cumia mestayerae (Iredale, 1915)
 Cumia reticulata (Blainville, 1829)
 Cumia schoutanica (May, 1910)
 Cumia simonis (Bozzetti, 2004)
 Cumia sunderlandi (Petuch, 1995)
Species brought into synonymy
 Cumia decussata Bivona-Bernardi, 1838: synonym of Cumia reticulata (Blainville, 1829)
 Cumia reticulata (A. Adams, 1855): synonym of Cumia mestayerae (Iredale, 1915)

References

 Beu A.G. & Maxwell P.A. (1987) A revision of the fossil and living gastropods related to Plesiotriton Fischer, 1884 (Family Cancellariidae, Subfamily Plesiotritoninae n. subfam.). With an appendix: Genera of Buccinidae Pisaniinae related to Colubraria Schumacher, 1817. New Zealand Geological Survey Paleontological Bulletin 54:1-140
 Vaught, K.C.; Tucker Abbott, R.; Boss, K.J. (1989). A classification of the living Mollusca. American Malacologists: Melbourne. . XII, 195 pp.

External links
 Bivona-Bernardi And., 1838. Generi e specie di molluschi descritti dal Barone Antonio Bivona e Bernardi. Lavori postumi pubblicati dal figlio Andrea dottore in medicina con note ed aggiunte. Giornale di Scienze Lettere e Arti per la Sicilia 61: 211-227
 ICZN 1993. Opinion 1765. Fusus Helbling, 1779 (Mollusca, Gastropoda): suppressed, and Fusinus Rafinesque, 1815 and Colubraria Schumacher, 1817: conserved. Bulletin of Zoological Nomenclature, 51(2): 159-161

Buccinidae